Kirill Gurov (6 March 1918 – 29 September 1994) was a Soviet Russian theoretical physicist working in the field of physical kinetics.

Gurov was born in Moscow, Russia, in the family of a military officer. In 1936, he was accepted without examinations to the Faculty of Physics and Mathematics in Moscow State University (MSU) and graduated from MSU in 1941, earning a Diploma with Honour.

In 1944, he started to work in MSU as a PhD student, under the supervision of Nikolay Bogolyubov, on problems of kinetic theory of quantum systems. From 1954, and for the rest of his life, Kirill Gurov worked at the A. A. Baikov Institute of Metallurgy and Material Science (IMMS).

Research
Kirill Gurov and Nikolay Bogolyubov obtained kinetic equations for quantum systems by developing the method of quantum BBGKY hierarchy.

At the IMMS, Kirill Gurov worked on analysis of the diffusion processes and the corresponding phase transitions in alloys. Since the middle of the 1970s, he worked on developing materials for space projects, participated in the Apollo-Soyuz Test Project, and studied the effects of zero gravity on material properties.

Books

Selected works

References

Quantum physicists
Soviet physicists
Moscow State University alumni
1918 births
1994 deaths
Theoretical physicists